Enders Dam (National ID # NE01070) is a dam in Chase County, Nebraska, near the southwestern corner of the state.

The earthen dam was constructed between 1947 and 1951 by the United States Bureau of Reclamation. It impounds Frenchman Creek for irrigation storage and flood control, part of the Bureau's Frenchman-Cambridge Division of the extensive Pick-Sloan Missouri Basin Program. The dam is owned and operated by the Bureau.

The adjoining Enders Reservoir State Recreation Area is a popular location for fishing, hunting and other outdoor recreation activities.

Flows in the Frenchman, and associated releases from Enders Reservoir, have declined over the years.  The primary cause is believed to be the lowering of water table levels due to groundwater irrigation in the Frenchman Basin.  This has reduced the flows of springs that have historically fed the creek.  In order to maintain the recreational and wildlife environments on the reservoir, irrigation releases were halted after 2002.

References 

Dams in Nebraska
Reservoirs in Nebraska
United States Bureau of Reclamation dams
Bodies of water of Chase County, Nebraska
Earth-filled dams
Dams completed in 1951
1951 establishments in Nebraska